The Napier Lion is a 12-cylinder, petrol-fueled 'broad arrow' W12 configuration aircraft engine built by D. Napier & Son from 1917 until the 1930s. A number of advanced features made it the most powerful engine of its day and kept it in production long after other contemporary designs had been superseded. It is particularly well known for its use in a number of racing designs, for aircraft, boats and cars.

Design and development

Early in the First World War, Napier were contracted to build aero engines to designs from other companies, initially a Royal Aircraft Factory model and then Sunbeams. Both engines proved to be unreliable and in 1916 Napier decided to design an engine with high power, light weight and low frontal area. Napier's engineers laid out the engine with its 12 cylinders in what they called a "broad arrow"—three banks of four cylinders sharing a common crankcase. This suggested the design's first name, the Triple-Four. The configuration is also known as a W engine. The engine was also advanced in form, the heads using four valves per cylinder with twin overhead camshafts on each bank of cylinders and a single block being milled from aluminium instead of the common separate-cylinder steel construction used on almost all other designs.

Under Arthur Rowledge, the design of the engine, renamed Lion, was completed in 1917; hand-built prototypes ran later that year. It was fitted to an Airco DH.9 in early 1918, and many cooling problems were observed during testing. The milled block was difficult to build with the required accuracy and the design reverted to separate aluminium cylinders. Both problems were solved by the middle of the year and the engine entered production in June 1918. The first Lion I versions delivered  from their 24 litres. The power output made the Lion the most powerful Allied aircraft engine, which had previously been the Liberty L-12, producing .

As the most powerful engine available (particularly after a turbocharger became an option in 1922), the Lion went on to commercial success. Through the years between the wars the Lion was ubiquitous and Napier manufactured little else. They stopped making cars in 1925 and little thought was given to replacing their world-famous product. Between the wars the Lion engine powered over 160 different aircraft types.

The record had been held by British drivers for 32 years. Lions powered successful entrants in the most prestigious event in air racing, the Schneider Trophy, in 1922 and 1927 but were dropped by Supermarine in favour of a new engine, the Rolls-Royce R, which had been designed for racing.

During the 1930s a new generation of much larger and more powerful engines appeared and the Lion became uncompetitive. By the time the Bristol Hercules and the Rolls-Royce Merlin arrived in the late 1930s, the Lion was obsolete. The Sea Lion, a marine version of the Lion, was used to power high speed RAF Rescue Launches.  The Lion aero engine was also adapted to power propeller-driven motor sleighs, which were used for high-speed transport and SAR duties on sea ice by the Finnish Air Force and Navy.

Turning away from the broad arrow layout, Napier designed new engines using the more compact H engine layout. The 16-cylinder Napier Rapier produced  and the 24-cylinder Napier Dagger delivered just under . The engines were smaller than contemporary designs from other companies and Napier started afresh with a new sleeve valve design, which evolved into the Napier Sabre.

Variants

Applications

Aircraft

Alliance P.2 Seabird
Avro Bison
Blackburn Blackburn
Blackburn Dart
Blackburn Pellet
Blackburn Ripon
Blackburn Velos
Boulton Paul Atlantic
Boulton Paul Bodmin
Boulton Paul Bolton
Bristol Ten-seater
English Electric Kingston (prototype)
Fairey III
Fairey Fawn
Felixstowe F.5 – (N4839)
Fokker C.IV-W
Fokker C.V
Fokker D.C.I
Fokker D.XIII
Gloster Gorcock
Gloster Guan
Handley Page H.P.31 Harrow
Handley Page Hyderabad
Handley Page W.10
Letov Š-8
Mitsubishi B1M
Parnall Pike
Parnall Possum
Parnall Puffin
Supermarine S.4
Supermarine S.5
Supermarine Seagull
Supermarine Southampton
Tarrant Tabor
Vickers Vernon
Vickers Valparaiso
Vickers Victoria
Vickers Virginia
Vickers Vixen
Westland Walrus

Other applications
 British Power Boat Company Type Two 63 ft HSL
 British Power Boat Company 60 ft 4 in
 Napier-Railton race car, Brooklands lap record holder
 Napier-Bentley, a 1968 special in the vintage tradition
 Golden Arrow world land speed record holder
 Railton Special world land speed record holder

Engines on display

Preserved Napier Lion engines are on static display at
 Brooklands Museum
 Canada Aviation Museum
 Imperial War Museum Duxford
 National Maritime Museum
 Solent Sky

Specifications (Lion II)

See also

References

Notes

Bibliography

 Lumsden, Alec. British Piston Engines and their Aircraft. Marlborough, Wiltshire: Airlife Publishing, 2003. .
 Vessey, Alan. Napier Powered. Stroud: Tempus (Images of England series), 1997. .

External links

  Contemporary technical description of the Lion with photographs and drawings.

 
Lion
1910s aircraft piston engines
W engines